Perimede maniola is a moth in the family Cosmopterigidae. It was described by Ronald W. Hodges in 1969. It is found in North America, where it has been recorded from Illinois.

The wingspan is 9-10.5 mm. The forewings are dark gray brown with four indistinct dark spots, followed and preceded by off-white scales. The hindwings are pale to medium gray. Adults have been recorded on wing in July and August.

References

Moths described in 1969
Chrysopeleiinae